UFC Fight Night: Felder vs. Hooker  (also known as UFC Fight Night 168 and UFC on ESPN+ 26) was a mixed martial arts event produced by the Ultimate Fighting Championship that took place on February 23, 2020, at Spark Arena in Auckland, New Zealand.

Background
The event was the third time that the promotion has hosted in Auckland and first since UFC Fight Night: Lewis vs. Hunt in June 2017.

A lightweight bout between Paul Felder and Dan Hooker served as the event headliner.

A light heavyweight bout between Tyson Pedro and Vinicius Moreira was scheduled for the event. However, Pedro pulled out of the fight in early January citing an undisclosed injury. In turn, promotion officials elected to remove Moreira from the card entirely.

A women's flyweight bout between Rachael Ostovich and Shana Dobson was scheduled for the event. However, Ostovich pulled out of the fight for an unknown reason and was replaced by Priscila Cachoeira.

A women's strawweight bout between Loma Lookboonmee and Hannah Goldy was scheduled for the event. However, Goldy pulled out due to a shoulder injury and was replaced by former Invicta FC Strawweight Champion Angela Hill.

A lightweight bout between Jamie Mullarkey and Jalin Turner was scheduled for the event. However, Mullarkey withdrew from the event due to injury and was replaced by promotional newcomer Joshua Culibao.

A welterweight bout between Maki Pitolo and Takashi Sato was scheduled for the preliminary portion of the card. However, the bout was cancelled as Pitolo failed to make it to the scale during the weigh-ins after falling ill and the matchup was called off by medical personnel.

Results

Bonus awards
The following fighters received $50,000 bonuses.
Fight of the Night: Dan Hooker vs. Paul Felder
Performance of the Night: Jimmy Crute and Priscila Cachoeira

See also 

 List of UFC events
 List of current UFC fighters
 2020 in UFC

References 

UFC Fight Night
Mixed martial arts in New Zealand
Sport in Auckland
2020 in mixed martial arts
2020 in New Zealand sport
February 2020 sports events in New Zealand